KPHF (88.3 FM) is a radio station broadcasting a religious radio format. It is licensed to Phoenix, Arizona.  The station is currently owned by Family Radio and airs several Christian ministry broadcasts from noted teachers such as RC Sproul, Alistair Begg, Ken Ham, John F. MacArthur, Adriel Sanchez, Dennis Rainey, John Piper, & others as well as traditional and modern hymns & songs by Keith & Kristyn Getty, The Master's Chorale, Fernando Ortega, Chris Rice, Shane & Shane, Sovereign Grace Music, Sara Groves, & multiple other Christian and Gospel music artists.

History
KVCP operates the programming during daytime hours from 5AM to 7:30PM, with the remaining hours used by KPHF. The stations' original owners began this shared time arrangement in 1990.

External links
 

PHF
Family Radio stations
Mass media in Maricopa County, Arizona